Expo 2023 was the name given to an upcoming specialized exhibition that was initially scheduled to be held in 2023 in Buenos Aires, Argentina. The Bureau International des Expositions (BIE) awarded Buenos Aires as the host on November 15, 2017. This was to have been the first time that a BIE Expo was held in Argentina, and the first in Latin America since BIE's creation. The 1875 exposition was the last one held in Latin America. In October 2020, Argentina announced that due to the COVID-19 pandemic in Argentina and the ensuing financial crisis, the Expo would not be held as planned in 2023.

Overview
The expo was scheduled to take place between 15 January and 15 April 2023.

The estimated number of visitors was 9.4 million, with 79% visiting for a day and 4% international visitors.

Over 100 countries were expected to participate.

Theme 
The exhibition will have a theme of “Science, Innovation, Art and Creativity for Human Development. Creative Industries in Digital Convergence”. It will have three sub themes: "How digital convergence reshapes the creative industries and everyday life", 
"Socio-economic impacts of the creative industries in digital convergence", and "Cultural impacts of the creative industries in digital convergence".

Preparation

Building works
The expo called for proposals for six building works as part of a "Architectural ideas Competition". There were 200 submissions from over 2000 participants.

The projects were for the Argentine Pavilion; Mini Stadium and International Pavilion; International Pavilions; Antenna and Viewpoint; Thematic Pavilions; and Public Space, Boulevard and Bridge.

The second for the “Small Stadium and the International Pavilions Building” which was to update two existing buildings and to creating a connecting foyer. Walter Casola was the winning architect for this.

The sixth project for public spaces includes a bridge to cross the Avenida General Paz linking two parts of the exposition ground and act as future legacy. The winning architects are Rodrigo Grassi; María Hojman; Karla Montauti; and Pablo Pschepiurca.

Recognition
The "Recognition Dossier" for the Argentine expo was submitted to the BIE on 14 January 2019. On 14 October 2020 the government told the BIE that they will not be able to host as planned and need more time.

Candidature
There were two other bids to host the specialized exhibition. Łódź, Poland submitted the bid with a “City Re:Invented” theme on 15 June 2016.

And Minneapolis, Minnesota, United States submitted a bid with theme “Healthy People, Healthy Planet: Wellness and Well Being for All”. 

A secret ballot took place to select the winner at BIE's 162nd General Assembly on 15 November 2017. The first ballot awarded 46 votes to both Buenos Aires and Łódź, with Minneapolis gathering only 25 (and 1 abstention). This meant that Minneapolis was eliminated and a second round ballot held which gave 62 votes to Buenos Aires and 56 to Łódź.

References

World's fairs in Argentina
Events in Buenos Aires
Scheduled events
2023 in Argentina
2020s in Buenos Aires